RU Ursae Minoris is a binary star system in the constellation Ursa Minor. Its apparent magnitude ranges from 10 to 10.66 over 0.52 days as one star passes in front of the other relative to observers on Earth.
Its component stars were calculated to be a primary star of spectral type F0IV/V and a secondary of spectral type K5V, both slightly more luminous than their spectral types indicate. The system is semidetached, as the secondary star is filling its Roche lobe and transferring matter to the primary. The primary is between 2.2 and 2.3 times as massive as the Sun, with 1.8 times its radius and around 8 times its luminosity. The secondary has around 0.72 times the Sun's mass, 1.1 times its radius and between 0.58 and 0.86 times its luminosity.

The period the two take to orbit each other is decreasing very slowly (by approximately 0.15 seconds per year), suggesting the components are moving closer and will become a contact binary.

References

Ursa Minor (constellation)
Eclipsing binaries
Ursae Minoris, RU
F-type main-sequence stars